San Fernando Pioneer Memorial Cemetery, earlier known as Morningside Cemetery, is a cemetery in the Sylmar district of Los Angeles. Located on a 3.8-acre (15,000 m2) site at the corner of Foothill Boulevard and Bledsoe Street, the Pioneer Cemetery was thought to be originally a 40-acre or 10-acre (400,000 m2) site.

History 
The cemetery was established in 1874 when Senator Charles Maclay created the Township of San Fernando. The last burial was most likely in 1939. It was known at the time as the San Fernando Cemetery and also as the Morningside Cemetery, and is the oldest non-denominational cemetery in the San Fernando Valley, the area's oldest cemetery being the San Fernando Mission Cemetery, which began operating in approximately 1800.

Until recently it was thought that over 700 residents were buried there between approximately 1892 and 1939. Due to heavy vandalism, there are only 13 tombstones remaining. After the cemetery was determined to be legally abandoned in 1959, it was acquired by the Native Daughters of the Golden West, San Fernando Mission Chapter #280, renamed, and maintained as a pioneer memorial park. Edith Reber, a longtime resident of Sylmar and an active member of the Chamber, ran a volunteer effort to maintain the grounds with the help of local volunteer groups for many years. In 2002, the Native Daughters gave the cemetery to the San Fernando Valley Historical Society. The Society has made many improvements to the property, including installing a memorial brick entrance and opening the cemetery to the public one day a month on the third Saturday. The Society also commissioned a ground-penetrating radar survey in 2010 that located only 214 gravesites. Through volunteer researchers, nearly 200 death certificates citing Morningside Cemetery have been located.

The cemetery was listed as a Los Angeles Historic-Cultural Monument in 1993. As "San Fernando Cemetery", it is a California Historical Landmark.

It is listed as a filming location for the 1959 Ed Wood movie “Plan 9 From Outer Space.”

See also
 List of Los Angeles Historic-Cultural Monuments in the San Fernando Valley

References

External links
 San Fernando Valley Historical Society
 Stephanie Chavez, "Sylmar Seeks to Undo Years of Ravages to Cemetery," Los Angeles Times, November 23, 1984, p. V-8 
 
 

Cemeteries in Los Angeles
Sylmar, Los Angeles
History of the San Fernando Valley
California Historical Landmarks
Los Angeles Historic-Cultural Monuments
Cemetery vandalism and desecration